Suresh Productions (also known as Suresh Movies, Vijaya Suresh Combines) is an Indian film production and distribution company known for its works in Telugu cinema. It is established in 1964 by D. Ramanaidu. It is one of India's largest film production companies with over 50 years of experience. The production house is located in Ramanaidu Studios, Hyderabad.

Suresh Productions has produced more than 150 films in 13 Indian languages, majority of them in the Telugu language. The first film produced by the company was Ramudu Bheemudu with NTR in 1964. Suresh Productions launched the careers of directors such as B. Gopal, Jayanth C. Paranjee, Muppalaneni Shiva, Tirupathi Swamy, and Uday Shankar and four music directors.

Filmography

Awards

References

External links
Ramanaidu Film School

Film production companies based in Hyderabad, India
Indian companies established in 1964
Film production companies of India
1964 establishments in Andhra Pradesh